Acne miliaris necrotica is a rare condition consisting of follicular vesicopustules, sometimes occurring as solitary lesions that are usually very itchy.  The condition affects middle aged and elderly individuals.  Affected areas can include the scalp, frontal hairline, face, and chest.

Causes 
It has been hypothesized that the body overreacts to an organism such as the S. aureus bacterium.

Diagnosis

Treatment 
There are multiple medications that are able to treat acne varioliformis.

Topical 
 Clindamycin 1% lotion or Benzoyl peroxide/clindamycin gel
 Erythromycin 2% gel
 1% hydrocortisone cream

Systemic 
 Doxycycline 50 mg twice daily
 Isotretinoin 0.5 mg/kg daily

See also
 List of cutaneous conditions

References

External links 

Acneiform eruptions